Ente Sathrukkal is a 1982 Indian Malayalam film, directed by S. Babu. The film stars Jayan in the lead role. The film has musical score by M. K. Arjunan.

Cast
Jayan

Soundtrack
The music was composed by M. K. Arjunan and the lyrics were written by Poovachal Khader.

References

External links
 

1982 films
1980s Malayalam-language films